Wolfgang Schillkowski (born 3 July 1942) is a German athlete. He competed in the men's high jump at the 1964 Summer Olympics.

References

1942 births
Living people
Athletes (track and field) at the 1964 Summer Olympics
German male high jumpers
Olympic athletes of the United Team of Germany
Sportspeople from Gdańsk